The Idaho Department of Correction (IDOC) operates nine prisons, four community release centers and 20 probation and parole offices in seven districts located throughout the state of Idaho. The agency has its headquarters in Boise.

IDOC employs about 2,000 people under the leadership of Director Josh Tewalt. Most of them are correctional officers and probation and parole officers. They are all certified peace officers and train at the Peace Officer Standards Training Academy in Meridian.

Private prisons 

As of 2016, IDOC contracts with one private prison firm, Management and Training Corporation, to run one facility:  the Correctional Alternative Placement Program, a 432-bed center focused on treatment programs and inmates with cognitive issues.  It opened in the summer of 2010.

Idaho entered into its first private prison project in July 2000, opening the Idaho Correctional Center with operator Corrections Corporation of America.  The state paid $29 million annually for the mixed-security prison.  An increasing number of lawsuits related to violent incidents, chronic understaffing and fraudulent recordkeeping revealed deep operational problems.  The Idaho State Police and the FBI launched investigations.  IDOC took over the facility in 2014.  As part of the long legal aftermath, in July 2015 IDOC itself faced federal court allegations that it had falsified inmate medical records, and was out of compliance with previous court orders.

Idaho has also exported prisoners to private prisons in other states.  From roughly 1998 to 2008, Idaho had placed inmates at Prairie Correctional Facility (Appleton, Minnesota), the Newton County Correctional Center (Newton, Texas), Dickens County Correctional Center, (Spur, Texas), Val Verde Correctional Facility (Del Rio, Texas), the Bill Clayton Detention Center (Littlefield, Texas), and the North Fork Correctional Facility (Sayre, Oklahoma).  This cycle ended around July 2009.

Once again in July 2012, IDOC exported about 200 prisoners to the Kit Carson Correctional Center in Burlington, Colorado, a contract that ended in mid-2016 and the closure of that prison.

Private partnerships
The department has contracted with JPay, a private firm that provides email and money-transfer services to prisoners. The department receives a commission for these transactions.

Facilities

South Boise Prison Complex

The South Boise Prison Complex is located in unincorporated Ada County, five miles (8 km) south of the Boise Airport and nine miles (15 km) east of Kuna. It has six prison facilities and one community work center.

 The Correctional Alternative Placement Program (CAPP) facility opened July 1, 2010.  Management and Training Corporation of Ogden, Utah built the facility and operates the program. CAPP offers intensive treatment programs for substance abuse and cognitive issues for up to 432 low to moderate risk male offenders needing substance abuse treatment. It houses three different groups of offenders: probationers, parolees and retained jurisdiction.
 Idaho State Correctional Center.  On 7/1/2014 IDOC took over ownership of the building from Corrections Corporation of America. The warden is Randy Valley.
 Idaho State Correctional Institution
 Idaho Maximum Security Institution (IMSI) is a high-security state prison. It opened in November 1989 to confine Idaho's most violent offenders.  The compound is located within a double perimeter fence reinforced with razor wire, an electronic detection system and a 24-hour armed perimeter patrol. The offender population includes a large number of mental health offenders, including subjects of civil commitments. Thirty beds are dedicated for prisoners with acute mental illness. IMSI has restrictive housing beds dedicated to administrative segregation, disciplinary detention and death row. The remaining beds are allocated for close-custody general population offenders.
 South Boise Women's Correctional Center (SBWCC) opened in March 2002 at the site of a former community work center. It is a program-specific, minimum-custody facility designed for female offenders sentenced to a retained jurisdiction commitment by the court. It provides a sentencing alternative for the courts to target those offenders who might, after a period of programming and evaluation, be viable candidates for probation rather than incarceration.  This facility has a safe operating capacity of 248.
 South Idaho Correctional Institution (SICI)  is a minimum-security prison. It receives mail through a post office box in Boise. SICI is a working facility, which houses male minimum custody offenders in a dormitory setting. A lot of the offenders will need to work and maintain that work to show the parole board they can handle being responsible along with programming. Those offenders who choose to work will have to apply for available positions and is expected to work whether inside or outside the facility compound. Sex offenders are not allowed to go off compound for work. Road crews for the Idaho Transportation Department and fire fighting crews for the U.S. Forest Service are located here. SICI also houses offenders who have almost completed their sentence (toppers). Toppers do not have to work if they choose not to. SICI also operates the final pre-release program for about 90 percent of offenders paroling from the system. The Idaho board of correction approved women residents to be housed here to alleviate overcrowding.
 The South Idaho Correctional Institution-Community Work Center (CWC) houses minimum-custody male offenders in a dormitory setting. Most offenders are assigned a job and work inside or outside the facility. Vocational Work Projects include road crews for the Idaho Transportation Department and conservation and fire fighting crews for the U.S. Forest Service. Some offenders serve as workers in the Correctional Industries program. It also operates the pre-release program for the majority of offenders paroling from the system.

Idaho Correctional Institution-Orofino
Idaho Correctional Institution-Orofino (ICIO) is a modified old state school and hospital mental health building in Orofino. A new wing was added in 1988. It is a standard prison designed for male offenders of all custody levels. The facility also houses protective custody offenders. Until April 1994, the state's female offenders were housed in one tier here, but due to litigation, females are now housed at the Pocatello Women's Correctional Center. Offender work programs, including correctional industries, are coordinated with schooling, counseling and recreational opportunities. The facility has a safe operating capacity is 541. The warden is Terema Carlin. The deputy warden of security is Amy Anderson and the deputy warden of operations is Ken Shriver.

North Idaho Correctional Institution

North Idaho Correctional Institution (NICI), northwest of Cottonwood.  A former radar station of the U.S. Air Force below Cottonwood Butte, it has been in the state correction system since 1974. It currently houses residents of the retained jurisdiction program. At one time it housed the sex offender treatment program, before it was moved to ICI-O.

Pocatello Women's Correctional Center

Pocatello Women's Correctional Center (PWCC) is a prison for women located in the southwestern portion of Pocatello. It opened in April 1994. It is designed specifically to house all custody levels of female offenders. The facility is the first of its kind for the Department of Corrections, and it is designed specifically to meet the special needs of female offenders and their programs. The facility has an operating capacity of 289 female offenders and houses all custody levels.

St. Anthony Work Camp

St. Anthony Work Camp (SAWC) is located in St. Anthony. It is designed to house 240 low-risk, minimum-custody male residents. The facility's primary focus is to provide vocational work project opportunities offering full-time, constructive, paid employment to residents.  This is accomplished through contracted work and public service projects with government agencies, non-profit organizations and private employers. The program helps residents develop good work habits, a positive work ethic and marketable work skills while providing a financial resource to meet immediate and future needs.

Work centers 
Nampa Community Work Center
East Boise Community Work Center
Twin Falls Community Work Center, closed August 1, 2011.
Idaho Falls Community Work Center

See also 

 List of law enforcement agencies in Idaho
 List of United States state correction agencies
 List of U.S. state prisons

References

External links 
 

Buildings and structures in Ada County, Idaho
Buildings and structures in Bannock County, Idaho
Buildings and structures in Clearwater County, Idaho
Buildings and structures in Fremont County, Idaho
Buildings and structures in Idaho County, Idaho
Capital punishment in Idaho
State law enforcement agencies of Idaho
 
State corrections departments of the United States